Casey Benjamin (born October 10, 1978) is an American saxophonist (alto and soprano), vocoderist, keyboardist, producer, and songwriter. He is a member of the Robert Glasper Experiment which won a Grammy Award for Best R&B Album for their album Black Radio. He is one half of the funk pop new wave duo HEAVy with vocalist Nicky Guiland. He was also a member of Stefon Harris' band Blackout and has worked with numerous artists at the intersection of jazz, hip-hop, and R&B, including Roy Hargrove, Betty Carter, Derrick Hodge, Victor Bailey, Kris Bowers, Kendrick Lamar, Nas, Q-Tip, Mos Def, Lupe Fiasco, Kanye West, Busta Rhymes, Diddy, Heavy D, Consequence, DJ Logic, Wyclef Jean, Bilal, Mary J. Blige, John Legend, and Beyonce. He has also worked with rockers Vernon Reid and Melvin Gibbs. In 2011, he was the keyboard/saxophonist for Patrick Stump's live solo project tour.

Benjamin is from South Jamaica, Queens, New York City. He picked up the saxophone at eight years old and continued studying the instrument at Fiorello H. LaGuardia High School of Music & Art and Performing Arts. He also attended workshops with legendary jazz pianist and educator Barry Harris. Later, he attended The New School for Jazz and Contemporary Music in Manhattan, where he met Robert Glasper.

Discography

As sideman

References

American male saxophonists
CIMP artists
Living people
People from Jamaica, Queens
American people of Grenadian descent
American multi-instrumentalists
Grammy Award winners
21st-century American saxophonists
21st-century American male musicians
1978 births